The foot is an anatomical structure found in many vertebrates.

Foot or feet may also refer to:

Measures
 Foot (unit), a unit of length, now usually 0.3048 m or 12 inches
 Foot of a perpendicular, in geometry, a point where perpendicular lines intersect
 Foot, an alternative name for the fotmal, a unit of weight usually equal to 70 pounds

Arts, entertainment, and media
 The Feet, a defunct American dance magazine (1970–1973)
 Foot (prosody), meter in poetry
 Foot Clan, a group of ninja in the Teenage Mutant Ninja Turtles series

Places
 Foot Lake, a lake in Minnesota
 Tchibanga Airport, Gabon (ICAO code FOOT)

People
 Foot (surname)

Other uses
 Foot (hieroglyph), an ancient Egyptian symbol
 Foot (mollusc), part of the typical mollusc body plan along with the shell, viscera, and mantle
 Foot (sewing), part of a sewing machine
 Foot (sailing), the lower edge of a sail
 Infantry; see List of Regiments of Foot
 Foot orienteering, the sport of orienteering

Acronym
 Faculty of Optics and Optometry of Terrassa, or FOOT, at Polytechnic University of Catalonia
 Foothill Independent Bancorp (NASDAQ: FOOT), California bank acquired in 2005 by First National Bancorp, now PacWest Bancorp